The Zambian records in swimming are the fastest ever performances of swimmers from Zambia, which are recognised and ratified by the Zambia Amateuer Swimming Union.

All records were set in finals unless noted otherwise.

Long Course (50 m)

Men

Women

Short Course (25 m)

Men

Women

Mixed relay

References

External links
 Zambia Amateur Swimming Union web site

Zambia
Swimming
Records
Swimming